The 2015 Miami RedHawks football team represented Miami University in the 2015 NCAA Division I FBS football season. They were led by second-year head coach Chuck Martin and played their home games at Yager Stadium and competed as a member of the East Division of the Mid-American Conference. They finished the season 3–9, 2–6 in MAC play to finish in a three way tie for fifth place in the East Division.

Schedule

Game summaries

Presbyterian

at Wisconsin

Cincinnati

at WKU

at Kent State

at Ohio

Northern Illinois

at Western Michigan

Buffalo

Eastern Michigan

Akron

at Massachusetts

References

Miami
Miami RedHawks football seasons
Miami RedHawks football